Saint Helena competed at the 2022 Commonwealth Games in Birmingham, England between 28 July and 8 August 2022. It was Saint Helena's eighth appearance at the Games.

Competitors
The following is the list of number of competitors participating at the Games per sport/discipline.

Athletics

Two athletes were officially selected on 18 February 2022.

Men
Track and road events

Badminton

One player was officially selected on 18 February 2022.

Swimming

Seven swimmers were officially selected on 18 February 2022.

Men

Women

Mixed

References

External links
National Sports Association of Saint Helena Official site

Nations at the 2022 Commonwealth Games
Saint Helena at the Commonwealth Games
2022 in Saint Helena